Jückelberg is a village and a former municipality in the district Altenburger Land, in Thuringia, Germany. Since July 2018, it is part of the municipality Nobitz. It is the easternmost settlement in Thuringia.

References

Altenburger Land
Duchy of Saxe-Altenburg
Former municipalities in Thuringia